Two Japanese Naval vessels have been named Jingei:

 , a corvette launched in 1876 and struck in 1894
 , a  launched in 1923 and lost in 1944

Imperial Japanese Navy ship names
Japanese Navy ship names